Edmée Winnifred Hiemstra (born 22 June 1970) is a retired water polo player from Netherlands. She participated in the 2000 Summer Olympics with Netherlands women's national water polo team, finishing in fourth place.

See also
 List of world champions in women's water polo
 List of World Aquatics Championships medalists in water polo

External links
 

1970 births
Living people
Dutch female water polo players
Olympic water polo players of the Netherlands
Water polo players at the 2000 Summer Olympics